Merry Legs (1911-1932) was a Tennessee Walking Horse mare who was given foundation registration for her influence as a broodmare. She was also a successful show horse.

Life
Merry Legs was foaled in April 1911. She was a bay with sabino markings. She was sired by the foundation stallion Black Allan F-1, out of the American Saddlebred mare Nell Dement, registration number F-3, and bred by the early breeder Albert Dement. Merry Legs was a successful show horse; as a three-year-old, she won the stake class at the Tennessee State Fair. She was also successful as a broodmare, giving birth to 13 foals, among them the well-known Bud Allen, Last Chance, Major Allen, and Merry Boy. For her influence on the breed, she was given the foundation number F-4 when the TWHBEA was formed in 1935. She died in 1932.

References

Individual Tennessee Walking Horses
1911 animal births
1932 animal deaths